Viliame Sevaka Mata (born 22 October 1991) is a Fijian rugby union player  currently playing for Scotland based United Rugby Championship side Edinburgh Rugby. 

Since joining Edinburgh Rugby, Mata has been affectionately known as "Big Bill" Mata owing to his power and ability to break through defences.

Career
Mata was born and raised in Nauluvatau, a small village in Nakelo, Tailevu and was selected by Ben Ryan to represent the Fiji sevens team to the  2014 Wellington Sevens as a replacement for Pio Tuwai.

Mata is a former professional rugby league footballer who went on to play for champion local 7's side, Davetalevu. He studied at Suva Grammar School before moving to Ratu Kadavulevu School.

Mata made the final Fiji squad for the 2016 Summer Olympics.

In July 2016, Mata signed for Pro12 side, Edinburgh for two-years and he joined the side after helping Fiji win Gold at the Olympics  but his visa-expired a year later as he was not capped internationally for Fiji and visas for player not capped by Kolpak countries were only for a year, he had to return to Fiji and get capped by the Fiji 15's team. He made his test debut against Australia on June 10 playing off the bench. He played 3 more tests for Fiji off the bench which allowed him to lodge a visa application to extend his visa to Scotland. He returned to Scotland in September 2017 and became a regular starter for the team.

In December 2017, he signed an extension to stay at Edinburgh Rugby until 2020. At the end of the 2018/19 Pro14 season, Mata was named the Guinness PRO14 the Players’ Player of the Season.

References

External links

 
 Mata Zimbio biodata, zimbio.com; accessed 11 September 2017.

Fiji international rugby union players
Fijian rugby union players
Fiji international rugby sevens players
People from Tailevu Province
1991 births
Living people
Rugby union flankers
Rugby union locks
Pacific Islanders rugby union players
I-Taukei Fijian people
Fijian people of I-Taukei Fijian descent
Male rugby sevens players
Rugby sevens players at the 2016 Summer Olympics
Olympic rugby sevens players of Fiji
Olympic gold medalists for Fiji
Olympic medalists in rugby sevens
Medalists at the 2016 Summer Olympics
Edinburgh Rugby players
Expatriate rugby union players in Scotland
Fijian expatriate rugby union players
People educated at Suva Grammar School